Serum response factor, also known as SRF, is a transcription factor protein.

Function 

Serum response factor is a member of the MADS (MCM1, Agamous, Deficiens, and SRF) box superfamily of transcription factors. This protein binds to the serum response element (SRE) in the promoter region of target genes. This protein regulates the activity of many immediate early genes, for example c-fos, and thereby participates in cell cycle regulation, apoptosis, cell growth, and cell differentiation. This gene is the downstream target of many pathways; for example, the mitogen-activated protein kinase pathway (MAPK) that acts through the ternary complex factors (TCFs).

SRF is important during the development of the embryo, as it has been linked to the formation of mesoderm. In the fully developed mammal, SRF is crucial for the growth of skeletal muscle. Interaction of SRF with other proteins, such as steroid hormone receptors, may contribute to regulation of muscle growth by steroids. Interaction of SRF with other proteins such as myocardin or Elk-1 may enhance or suppress expression of genes important for growth of vascular smooth muscle.

Clinical significance 

Lack of skin SRF is associated with psoriasis and other skin diseases.

Interactions 

Serum response factor has been shown to interact with:

 ASCC3,
 ATF6, 
 CEBPB, 
 CREB-binding protein, 
 ELK4, 
 GATA4, 
 GTF2F1, 
 GTF2I, 
 Myogenin, 
 NFYA, 
 Nuclear receptor co-repressor 2, 
 Promyelocytic leukemia protein and 
 Src,  and
 TEAD1.

See also 
 MKL1
 Nuclear actin functions

References

Further reading

External links 
 
 

Transcription factors